Ira Lawrence Gordon (born May 5, 1947 in Kilbourne, Louisiana) is a former professional American football player who played offensive tackle for six seasons for the San Diego Chargers. He was a starter for the last two. Left unprotected in the 1976 NFL Expansion Draft, he was selected by the Tampa Bay Buccaneers. He was expected to start for the Bucs, but wound up as a surprise training camp cut. Coach John McKay would not comment on outgoing players, but had earlier expressed concern that, although Gordon had potential to be one of the league's better guards, he would have difficulty learning the team's offensive system due to missing much of training camp with a contract dispute. Gordon believed that Buccaneer coaches soured on his outspokenness over harsh practice conditions, which included two-a-day practices in the Tampa sun with no water breaks, and refused to play football after the experience. The brother of Arizona State University and Miami Dolphins linebacker Larry Gordon, he worked in Phoenix, Arizona as a drug counselor after his NFL career.

References

1947 births
Living people
People from West Carroll Parish, Louisiana
Players of American football from Louisiana
American football offensive tackles
San Diego Chargers players
Kansas State Wildcats football players
Tampa Bay Buccaneers players